Sarrià-Sant Gervasi is one of the biggest districts of Barcelona. It's the district with the highest per capita income, the largest proportion of university degrees and the lowest unemployment rate. Situated on the north-west of the city, surrounded by the districts of Les Corts, Gràcia, Eixample and Horta-Guinardó and by the villages of Sant Just, Sant Feliu, Molins de Rei, and Sant Cugat. It is formed by the old villages of Sarrià (added to Barcelona in 1927), Vallvidrera (added to Sarrià in 1890), Santa Creu d'Olorda (added to Sarrià in 1916), and Sant Gervasi ("Saint Gervasius") de Cassoles (added to Barcelona in 1897). The first written document found about Sarrià dates from the year 987, and the origins of the village are a Roman colony. The old Monestir de Pedralbes belonged to the village of Sarrià, and it is now the Museo Thyssen-Bornemisza.

Today, Sarrià still retains a village atmosphere, even in the middle of Barcelona, with narrow streets and small houses. The main street of Sarrià is Major de Sarrià.

The main market in Sarrià-Sant Gervasi is the Mercat de Sarrià on Passeig Reina Elisenda, which opened in 1900 and was renovated in 1967 and again in 2007.

Part of the Collserola mountain belongs to the district, where the Tibidabo and the Observatori Fabra are, and it is a popular place to promenade by bike or by foot or to stop by the road to Sant Cugat, with impressive views over the city.

Neighbourhoods
It is divided in these neighbourhoods (some of them include traditional or non-administrative neighbourhoods):
El Putget i Farró
Sarrià
Sant Gervasi - la Bonanova
Sant Gervasi - Galvany
les Tres Torres
Vallvidrera, Tibidabo i les Planes

Education
The preschool through lower secondary campus of Istituto Italiano Statale Comprensivo di Barcellona, an Italian international school, is in Sarrià.

The institution of Lycée Français de Barcelone, a French international school, is also located in this neighbourhood.

Notable people
Porta (rapper)

See also

Districts of Barcelona

 Street names in Barcelona
 Urban planning of Barcelona

References

 
Districts of Barcelona